Heterocyemida is an order of parasites which dwell in the renal appendages of cephalopods.

References

Parasites of molluscs
Protostome orders
Parasitic protostomes